Robert Coffin may refer to:

Robert P. T. Coffin (1892–1955), American writer, poet and professor
Robert Coffin (bishop) (1819–1885), Catholic bishop
Bob Coffin (born 1942), American politician